Glen Riddersholm (born 24 April 1972) is a Danish football manager. He is the current manager of Allsvenskan club IFK Norrköping.

Coaching career
He started as youth coach at Ikast fS and continued in this job, when the club merged with Herning Fremad to form FC Midtjylland.

In 2006, he replaced Hans Brun Larsen as the manager of the Danish national under-17 football team. After two years in this job he returned to Midtjylland to become assistant manager.

When Allan Kuhn resigned on 15 April 2011, Riddersholm was promoted to the position as head coach. Riddersholm led the club to its first Danish championship in the 2014-15 Danish Superliga, but shortly after he resigned as manager of the club.

On 6 December 2015 he was named successor of Morten Wieghorst as manager of AGF. He was sacked in September 2017.

In October 2018 he was named new director of sports of Vendsyssel FF.

On 19 December 2018 it was announced that Riddersholm would become new manager of SønderjyskE in the Danish Superliga starting on 1 February 2019.

On 26 May 2021, it was announced that he would not be the manager of SønderjyskE going forward as the club's owners had decided to make changes in the club's management.

In November 2021 Riddersholm was made new assistant manager of John van den Brom and later Bernd Storck at Belgian Pro League club Genk. This cooperation was ended in June 2022.

On 8 August 2022 he was hired as new manager of Swedish Allsvenskan club IFK Norrköping succeeding the sacked Rikard Norling.

Coaching record

Honours

Managerial

FC Midtjylland
 Danish Superliga: 2014–15

SønderjyskE
Danish Cup: 2019–20

References

1972 births
Living people
People from Esbjerg
Danish football managers
FC Midtjylland managers
Aarhus Gymnastikforening managers
SønderjyskE Fodbold managers
IFK Norrköping managers
Danish Superliga managers
Allsvenskan managers
Sportspeople from the Region of Southern Denmark